The Devil in a Forest is a short novel by American writer Gene Wolfe about the conflict between Christianity and an earlier Pagan religion in Europe during the Middle Ages.
The hero of the story, Mark, is an adolescent, an orphan, and the apprentice to a weaver very near a small holy Christian shrine. The shrine is within the King's Forest, and the very small village where he lives is on the edge of the forest. During the course of the novel the village is occupied by both a brutal squad of the King's foresters, and a mob of the pagan charcoal burners who eke out a living in the forest.

Wolfe explains, in an author's note, that the novel was inspired by a stanza of the traditional Christmas carol "Good King Wencelas".
He describes the novel as an attempt to imagine what peasant life was like.

References

American historical novels
1976 American novels
1976 fantasy  novels